The 9th Rhode Island Infantry Regiment was a unit of the Union Army during the American Civil War; raised in Rhode Island and seeing service between May and September 1862.

History
Organized at Providence May 26, 1862, the 9th Rhode Island Infantry Regiment moved to Washington, D. C., by detachments on May 27 and 29. Duty at Camp Frieze, Tennallytown, till July. Moved to Fairfax Seminary, Va., July 1. Garrison duty in the Defences of Washington till September. Company "A" at Fort Greble, "B" at Fort Meigs, "C" at Fort Ricketts, "D" at Fort Snyder, "E" and "K" at Fort Baker, "F" at Fort Carroll, "G" at Fort Dupont, "H" at Fort Wagner, "I" at Fort Stanton and "L" at Fort Davis. Mustered out September 2, 1862.

Service
Garrison duty in Washington, D.C.

Losses
The Regiment lost 4 soldiers by disease.

See also
 List of Rhode Island Civil War units

References

Military units and formations established in 1862
Military units and formations disestablished in 1862
Units and formations of the Union Army from Rhode Island
1862 establishments in Rhode Island